International School Manila (abbreviation: ISM) is a private, non-profit, non-sectarian international school located in Bonifacio Global City, Taguig, Metro Manila, Philippines. Founded in 1920 as the American School by a group of American and British parents living in Manila, it adopted its present name in 1970.
 
International School Manila is one of six members of the Interscholastic Association of Southeast Asian Schools (IASAS).

History
A group of American and British expatriates established the American School, Inc. on June 21, 1920. It was first located at 606 Taft Avenue, a loaned church building in Manila, with eight teachers and fifty students from Grades 1 to 12. It transferred later that year to M.H. Del Pilar Street and in 1922 to Padre Faura Street, both also in Manila. The campus was transferred to Donada Street, Pasay in 1936. It was closed in 1942 during World War II and was reopened by September 1946. The campus was then transferred near Bel-Air, Makati in 1961.

In 1970, the American School was renamed to International School Manila (ISM) at the recommendation of the US Embassy. In the same year, ISM also became the first international school to receive accreditation by the Western Association of Schools and Colleges (WASC). In 1982, ISM joined the Interscholastic Association of Southeast Asian Schools (IASAS). By 2002, the school transferred from Makati to its present location in Bonifacio Global City. The site of the former Makati campus is now occupied by Century City.

Campus and facilities
The ISM campus sits on a  site located in Bonifacio Global City, Taguig, Metro Manila.

Organization and leadership
The ISM is divided into three departments, each having their own faculty and administration. Its overall administration is headed by the Superintendent.

Curriculum

There are three years of preschool, and twelve years of primary and secondary education. Its K–12 standard is based from the American school system. As a result, it has a different implementation of the program from the one proposed by the Department of Education.

Its Elementary department includes three years of pre-school and kindergarten, as well as the first four grades of grade school. These four years of grade school correspond to the American primary school system. Its Middle School department is from fifth grade to eighth grade, equivalent to the last two years of grade school and the first two years high school for the rest of the country. Its high school department is from ninth grade to twelfth grade, corresponding to the last two years of junior high school and both years of senior high school.
High school students in the last two years are offered the choice to take the International Baccalaureate curriculum.

Sports

There are numerous sports facilities at the International School Manila. ISM has two artificial football/ rugby fields (one 4G standard) on its campus and one small real grass field. There are 8 rooftop-covered tennis courts, a 10-line climbing wall, 4 sports gymnasiums (HS, MS, ES and PS), a gymnastics floor, 3 swimming pools, a martial arts room, a fitness suite and a weights and cardio facility. ISM plays within the IASAS competition within the 3 seasons of HS sport.

References

External links
International School Manila

International schools in Metro Manila
International Baccalaureate schools in the Philippines
Education in Bonifacio Global City
Educational institutions established in 1920
1920 establishments in the Philippines